Marthon is a commune in the Charente department in southwestern France.

Population

See also
 Château de Marthon - castle ruins
Communes of the Charente department

References

Communes of Charente